The women's dragon boat (traditional boat race) 500 metres competition at the 2018 Asian Games was held on 26 August 2018.

Schedule
All times are Western Indonesia Time (UTC+07:00)

Squads

Results

Heats
 Qualification: 1–3 → Semifinals (SF), Rest → Repechage (R)

Heat 1

Heat 2

Repechage
 Qualification: 1–4 → Semifinals (SF), Rest → Tail race (TR)

Semifinals
 Qualification: 1–3 → Grand final (GF), Rest → Tail race (TR)

Heat 1

Heat 2

Finals

Tail race

Grand final

References

External links
Official website

Women's 500 metres